Giovanni Cornacchia (18 June 1939 – 23 July 2008 in Pescara) was an Italian hurdler who specialized in the 110 m distance. He won a gold medal at the 1967 Mediterranean Games and silver medals at the 1962 European Championships and 1965 Universiade. He competed at the 1960, 1964 and 1968 Olympics with the best result of seventh place in 1964.

Biography
Cornacchia won three national titles in the 110 m hurdles: in 1960, 1962 and 1964.

On 22 October 2009, the Stadio Adriatico in Pescara was renamed to Stadio Adriatico – Giovanni Cornacchia.

References

External links
 

1939 births
Sportspeople from Pescara
Italian male hurdlers
Athletes (track and field) at the 1960 Summer Olympics
Athletes (track and field) at the 1964 Summer Olympics
Athletes (track and field) at the 1968 Summer Olympics
Olympic athletes of Italy
2008 deaths
European Athletics Championships medalists
Mediterranean Games gold medalists for Italy
Athletes (track and field) at the 1967 Mediterranean Games
Universiade medalists in athletics (track and field)
Mediterranean Games medalists in athletics
Universiade silver medalists for Italy
Medalists at the 1965 Summer Universiade